The Royal Town Planning Institute (RTPI) is the professional body representing planners in the United Kingdom, and Ireland.  It promotes and develops policy affecting planning and the built environment.  Founded in 1914, the institute was granted a royal charter in 1959.  In 2018 it reported that it had over 25,000 members.

Origins
Following the Housing, Town Planning, &c. Act 1909, surveyors, civil engineers, architects, lawyers and others began working together within local government in the UK to draw up schemes for the development of land.  The idea of town planning as a new and distinctive area of expertise began to be formed.  In 1910, Thomas Adams was appointed as the first Town Planning Inspector at the Local Government Board, and began having meetings with practitioners.  In November 1913, a meeting was convened of interested professionals to establish a new Institute, and Adams was elected as the group's president.  The Town Planning Institute (TPI) was launched with an inaugural dinner in January 1914, and it was formally established on 4 September 1914 when its Articles of Association were signed. The first three of the Articles of Association were:To advance the study of town-planning, civic design and kindred subjects, and of the arts and sciences as applied to those subjects;
To promote the artistic and scientific development of towns and cities;
To secure the association, and to promote the general interests of those engaged or interested in the practice of town-planning.

In 1928 the institute elected its first female professional member, Jocelyn Frere Adburgham, and in 1959 received its royal charter, then becoming the Royal Town Planning Institute.

Functions
The RTPI currently states that it is:
A membership organisation and a Chartered Institute responsible for maintaining professional standards and accrediting world class planning courses nationally and internationally.
A charity whose charitable purpose is to advance the science and art of planning (including town and country and spatial planning) for the benefit of the public.
A learned society.

Members
The institute supports its membership through professional development, education and training for future planners. Fellows are entitled the use of the post-nominals FRTPI and chartered members may use MRTPI.  In March 2012, it reported that it had over 23,000 members, of which 8,000 were women and 15,000 men.  These included 1,100 international members, across 82 countries. There are currently eight membership classes:

Student For full or part-time students on courses related to planning or the built environment.
Licentiate Licentiate membership is the main pathway to qualify as a Chartered Town Planner.
Member Chartered membership signifies that its holder has knowledge, skills and competence in spatial planning in appropriate depth and detail. Members may use the post-nominals MRTPI.
Fellow Fellowship is the organisations most prestigious accolade and recognises those who have made a major contribution to the profession. Fellows may use the post-nominals FRTPI.
Legal Associate For qualified legal practitioners who specialise and have experience in planning law.
Affiliate For people who have an interest in planning, or are working in planning but are not yet qualified for other membership classes.
Retired For those no longer practicing or earning an income from planning.

Governance
The RTPI is governed by a General Assembly and a board of trustees. The General Assembly is responsible for the development of planning policy and practice. The board of trustees is responsible for managing the affairs of the RTPI as a chartered body and registered charity.

Research
The RTPI promotes research activity underpinning and evaluating planning practice, theory and education. The RTPI holds an annual awards ceremony recognising excellence in the field of planning and urban design.

Planning Aid
The RTPI runs Planning Aid in England, outside London where Planning Aid for London operates. There is a linked organization, Planning Aid Wales.  Planning Aid provides free, independent and professional planning advice to communities and individuals who cannot afford to pay consultant fees. It was established by the Town and Country Planning Association in 1973 and involves volunteers working on casework and community planning activities.

Presidents

A full list of presidents is set out below. The first president, in 1914, was Thomas Adams. The first female president, in 1974, was Sylvia Law.

1914 Thomas Adams
1915 Sir Raymond Unwin
1916 John William Cockrill
1917 Edmund Rushworth Abbot
1918 Stanley Davenport Adshead
1919 George Lionel Pepler
1920 Henry Edward Stilgoe
1921 Robert Armstrong Reay-Neadin
1922 Henry Vaughan Lanchester
1923 Thomas Hayton Mawson
1924 William Thomas Lancashire
1925 Sir Patrick Abercrombie
1926 William Robert Davidge
1927 George Montagu Harris
1928 Edward Willis
1929 Richard Barry Parker
1930 Frederick William Platt
1931 Richard Cowdy Maxwell
1932 Francis Longstreth Thompson
1933 Thomas Alwyn Lloyd
1934 Sir Herbert Humphries
1935 Maj. Leslie Roseveare
1936 Ernest Gladstone Allen
1937 Ewart Gladstone Culpin
1938 Joshua Edward Acfield
1939 William Harding Thompson
1940 Oswald Alfred Radley
1941 Robert Henry Mattocks
1942 Col. William Spottiswoode Cameron
1943 William Dobson Chapman
1944 Sir Thomas Peirson Frank
1945 Thomas Wilfred Sharp
1946 Henry William James Heck
1947 Sir James Reginald Howard Roberts
1948 James Whirter Renwick Adams
1949 Sir George Lionel Pepler
1950 Lt-Col. Henry Philip Cart De Lafontaine
1951 Ernest Hone Ford
1952 Samuel Leslie George Beaufoy
1953 Lord Holford
1954 Ernest Harvey Doubleday
1955 Sir Desmond Heap
1956 Maurice James Hellier
1957 Bernard John Collins
1958 Udolphus Aylmer Coates
1959 Joseph Stanley Allen
1960 Rowland Nicholas
1961 John Jefferson
1962 Denis Wearing Riley
1963 Sir Colin Douglas Buchanan
1964 Leslie William Lane
1965 Lewis Bingham Keeble
1966 Nathaniel Lichfield
1967 Sir Wilfred Burns
1968 Arthur George Ling
1969 Phipps Turnbull
1970 Walter George Bor
1971 Francis John Clarke Amos
1972 John Stanley Millar
1973 Graham William Ashworth
1974 Sylvia Law
1975 Ewart West Parkinson
1976 Sir John Keyworth Boynton
1977 Tom Clarke
1978 Gordon Cherry
1979 Geoffrey Booth
1980 John Frederick Norman Collins
1982 Andrew Thorburn
1983 John Edgar Finney
1984 John Stewart Anderson
1985 Stephen Philip Byrne
1986 George McDonic
1987 John Dean
1988 Francis Tibbalds
1989 Chris Shepley
1990 Robin Thompson
1991 Peter Fidler
1992 Michael Welbank
1993 Martin Bradshaw
1994 Hazel McKay
1995 Jed Griffiths
1996 Cliff Hague
1997 William Anthony Keith Struthers
1998 Trevor Roberts
1999 Brian Raggett
2000 Kevin Murray
2001 Nick Davies
2002 Mike Haslam
2003 Vincent Goodstadt
2004 Mike Hayes
2005 Ron Tate
2006 Clive Harridge
2007 Jim Claydon
2008 Janet O'Neill
2009 Martin Willey
2010 Ann Skippers
2011 Richard Summers
2012 Colin Haylock
2013 Peter Geraghty
2014 Cath Ranson
2015 Janet Askew
2016 Phil Williams
2017 Stephen Wilkinson
2018 John Acres
2019 Ian Tant
2020 Sue Manns
2021 Wei Yang
2022 Timothy David Crawshaw
2023 Sue Bridge

Gold Medal

The RTPI's most prestigious award is its gold medal. It is awarded at the discretion of the RTPI for outstanding achievement in the field of town and country planning. There have been 15 recipients of the Gold Medal since its inception in 1953. It's been awarded to:

1953 Sir George Pepler
1955 Sir Patrick Abercrombie
1957 Lewis Mumford
1961 Sir William Holford
1963 Sir Frederic Osborn
1967 Sir Colin Buchanan
1971 Lord Lewis Silkin
1974 Sir Robert Grieve
1978 Sir Frederick Gibberd
1983 Sir Desmond Heap
2003 Sir Peter Hall
2006 Professor Patsy Healy
2013 Alison Nimmo
2016 Professor Michael Batty
2017 Sir Terry Farrell

See also
Construction Industry Council
Map for England
Town and country planning in the United Kingdom

References

External links
 RTPI Royal Charter of 1959, as amended, October 2012, and Byelaws and Regulations

1914 establishments in the United Kingdom
Interested parties in planning in the United Kingdom
Organisations based in the City of London
Organizations established in 1914
Town Planning
Professional planning institutes
Town and country planning in the United Kingdom